The 2018 season for the  cycling team began in January.

2018 roster

Riders who joined the team for the 2018 season

Riders who left the team during or after the 2017 season

Season victories

National, Continental and World champions 2018

Footnotes

References

External links
 

Bora-Hansgrohe
Bora–Hansgrohe
2018 in German sport